This was the first edition of the tournament. Misaki Doi won the title, defeating in the final Anna-Lena Friedsam with the score 6–4, 6–2.

Seeds

Draw

Finals

Top half

Bottom half

References
 Main Draw
 Qualifying Draw

San Antonio Open - Women's Singles
San Antonio Open